Trifolium stellatum, the star clover, is a species of annual herb in the family Fabaceae. They have a self-supporting growth form and compound, broad leaves. Flowers are visited by mason bees, Anthocopa, Osmia aurulenta, and Anthophora. Individuals can grow to 0.11 m.

Sources

References 

stellatum
Flora of Malta